Mathías Adolfo Cardaccio Alaguich (born 2 October 1987) is an Uruguayan footballer who plays as a midfielder.

Career

Club career

Cardaccio began his playing career with Club Nacional de Football in Uruguay. His most famous goal for the club came in a 3–1 win against Cienciano that allowed Nacional to progress to the knockout stages of Copa Libertadores 2008. His talent did not go unnoticed and he was signed by A.C. Milan on a 4-year contract.

Cardaccio made his competitive debut for Milan in a 1–2 Coppa Italia loss to Lazio on 3 December 2008. He made his debut in Serie A on 26 April 2009, in Milan 3–0 win over Palermo, which later proved to be his only appearance with the rossoneri'. On 28 August 2009 Milan announced to have released Cardaccio and fellow Uruguayan Tabaré Viudez by mutual consent.

His next club were Defensor Sporting Club back in Uruguay but on 29 January 2010 he was loaned to Banfield from Defensor Sporting, who had signed him on a free transfer during summer 2009.

In 2010, he joined Mexican side Atlante.

Chilean side Colo Colo reached an agreement to sign Cardaccio from his Greek club Asteras Tripoli F.C. in February 2013.

International career
In 2007 Cardaccio took part in the FIFA U-20 World Cup with Uruguay. There he scored an own goal in a match against the United States.

Personal life
Mathías is the nephew of former Uruguayan player Jorge Daniel Cardaccio, who also played for Nacional. His sister, Belén, is a former Uruguay international footballer.

References

External links

 
 
 
 
 
 

1987 births
Living people
Footballers from Montevideo
Uruguayan footballers
Uruguayan expatriate footballers
Uruguay under-20 international footballers
Uruguay international footballers
Association football midfielders
Club Nacional de Football players
A.C. Milan players
Club Atlético Banfield footballers
Atlante F.C. footballers
Londrina Esporte Clube players
Asteras Tripolis F.C. players
Colo-Colo footballers
Colo-Colo B footballers
Defensor Sporting players
Dorados de Sinaloa footballers
Uruguayan Primera División players
Serie A players
Argentine Primera División players
Liga MX players
Super League Greece players
Chilean Primera División players
Segunda División Profesional de Chile players
Ascenso MX players
Uruguayan Segunda División players
Expatriate footballers in Italy
Expatriate footballers in Argentina
Expatriate footballers in Mexico
Expatriate footballers in Brazil
Expatriate footballers in Greece
Expatriate footballers in Chile
Uruguayan expatriate sportspeople in Italy
Uruguayan expatriate sportspeople in Argentina
Uruguayan expatriate sportspeople in Mexico
Uruguayan expatriate sportspeople in Brazil
Uruguayan expatriate sportspeople in Greece
Uruguayan expatriate sportspeople in Chile